Mary Villiers, Countess of Buckingham (née Beaumont; c. 1570 – 19 April 1632) is perhaps best known as the mother of the royal favourite Sir George Villiers, 1st Duke of Buckingham. She was the daughter of Anthony Beaumont of Glenfield, Leicestershire, a direct descendant of Henry de Beaumont, and his wife Anne Armstrong, daughter of Thomas Armstrong of Corby.

Family 

After his first wife Audrey Saunders died on 1 May 1587, she became the second wife of Sir George Villiers, who was her cousin through his mother Colette, widow of Richard Beaumont. They had four children:
John (c. 1590-1658), later created Viscount Purbeck.
George (1592-1628), later created Duke of Buckingham.
Christopher (died 1630), later created Earl of Anglesey.
Susan (died 1651), married William Feilding, 1st Earl of Denbigh.

Following the death of her first husband, she was created Countess of Buckingham in her own right in 1618. She made two further marriages, to Sir William Rayner of Orton, Peterborough, in 1606 and finally to Sir Thomas Compton, a younger son of Henry Compton, 1st Baron Compton. She became a Roman Catholic convert in the early 1620s, under the influence of the Jesuit John Percy.

Mother of the royal favourite 

Mary seems to have been the first person to recognise that George, her second son, had the ability to become a figure of political importance. Although she was said to have been penniless when she married his father, she somehow found the money to send him to the French court, where he learned the courtly skills, including fencing and dancing, and gained some fluency in the French language. Having found the funds to fit him out with a suitable wardrobe, she then sent him to the English Court, where he rapidly became the new favourite of King James I. As George rose, his mother, brothers and half-brothers rose with him: the King in 1618 said that he lived to no other end but to advance the Villiers family.

Mary arranged George's marriage to the great heiress Katherine, Baroness de Ros, who was said to be the richest woman in England. Her enemies said that she had entrapped Katherine into the marriage by arranging for her to spend the night under the same roof as George, thus tarnishing her reputation and leaving her family with no choice but to accept George's proposal.

In May 1623 she was at Goadby Marwood, with Viscount Purbeck, and wrote to the Earl of Middlesex with congratulations on the birth of his daughter Frances Cranfield. The Countess of Buckingham was often at court, and rode hunting on horseback with King James and her daughter, the Countess of Denbigh, on 19 June 1624 (the King's birthday) from Wanstead House. When King James was on his deathbed at Theobalds she arranged for his treatment with a plaster applied to his wrists. This angered the physician John Craig who rebuked her. For his speeches to the Countess, Craig was ordered to leave court.

She lent £50 to the playwright Elizabeth Cary, Viscountess Falkland in 1627. When the Duke of Buckingham was assassinated in 1628, it was said that she reacted to the news without any sign of surprise, as though it was something she had long expected. Whatever her private feelings may have been, she behaved outwardly after his death in a manner which struck most people as cold and unfeeling. She died four years later and was buried in Westminster Abbey.

She was a woman of formidable strength of character, but she was never popular, due to what was described as her relentless ambition and greed. She had been beautiful when young, but her manners struck the Court as loud and tactless.

James Stow engraved a drawing of her by George Perfect Harding in 1814.

See also
 Villiers family

Notes

Year of birth uncertain
1632 deaths
English countesses
Wives of knights
Converts to Roman Catholicism from Anglicanism
Life peeresses created by James VI and I
Mary Villiers, Countess of Buckingham
English Roman Catholics
16th-century Roman Catholics
17th-century Roman Catholics
16th-century English women
17th-century English women
16th-century English nobility
17th-century English nobility
People from Glenfield, Leicestershire
Household of Henrietta Maria